This is a list of Cypriot football transfers for the 2016–17 summer transfer window by club. Only transfers of clubs in the Cypriot First Division and Cypriot Second Division are included.

The summer transfer window opened on 9 June 2016, although a few transfers took place prior to that date. The window closed at midnight on 31 August 2016. Players without a club may join one at any time, either during or in between transfer windows.

Cypriot First Division

AEK Larnaca

In:

Out:

AEL Limassol

In:

Out:

AEZ Zakakiou

In:

Out:

Anagennisi Deryneia

In:

Out:

Anorthosis Famagusta

In:

Out:

APOEL

In:

Out:

Apollon Limassol

In:

Out:

Aris Limassol

In:

	

Out:

Doxa Katokopias

In:

Out:

Ermis Aradippou

In:

Out:

Ethnikos Achna

In:

Out:

Karmiotissa

In:

Out:

Nea Salamina

In:

Out:

Omonia

In:

Out:

Cypriot Second Division

Akritas Chlorakas

In:

Out:

Alki Oroklini

In:

Out:

ASIL

In:

Out:

Ayia Napa

In:

Out:

ENAD Polis Chrysochous

In:

Out:

Enosis Neon Paralimni

In:

Out:

Enosis Neon Parekklisia

In:

Out:

Ethnikos Assia

In:

Out:

Olympiakos Nicosia

In:

Out:

Omonia Aradippou

In:

Out:

Othellos Athienou

In:

Out:

PAEEK

In:

Out:

Pafos FC

In:

Out:

THOI Lakatamia

In:

Out:

References

Cypriot
tran
Cypriot football transfers